Stacey Dooley Sleeps Over is a British documentary television series which is broadcast on W.

In each episode, presenter Stacey Dooley stays for 72 hours at the house of an unusual family.

The first series was shown in 2019 and the second in 2021.

In 2023, the series began following families in America, with an initial three-part run.

Episodes

Series 1: 2019
 4 September: Open Marriage
 11 September: The Family Who Live Online
 18 September: The Family Without Rules
 25 September: Cage-Fighting Teen
 2 October: Mormons
 9 October: Landed Gentry

Series 2: 2021
 3 May: Tradwife
 10 May: Child Model
 17 May: Eco Warriors
 24 May: The British Lion King
 31 May: Strictly Orthodox Jews
 7 June: Living with Down's Syndrome

Series 3: 2022 
 Body Positive Warrior (International Women's Day Special)
 Britain's Most Hated Woman? 
 70-Year-Old Dominatrix
 Mum Fighting the Clock

Stacey Dooley Sleeps Over USA 
 9-Year-Old GunTuber
 Transgender Mum and Dad
 37-Year Age Gap Lovers

See also
 Sleepover
 Livin' with Lucy

References

External links

Stacey Dooley Sleeps Over 
Stacey Dooley Sleeps Over USA 

Stacey Dooley
2019 British television series debuts
2010s British documentary television series
2020s British documentary television series
UKTV original programming
English-language television shows